Richard Hills (born 22 January 1963) is a retired flat racing jockey. He is twin brother to Michael Hills (also a jockey) and their father is former racehorse trainer Barry Hills. The twins' older brother John Hills was also a trainer. They also have two younger brothers, Charles Hills (who has succeeded their father Barry as a racehorse trainer) and George Hills who works in the Breeding and Insurance side of the industry in Kentucky, United States. Richard enjoys breeding ducks, Persian Cats and plane spotting.

Richard Hills rode his first winner, Border Dawn, at Doncaster Racecourse on 26 October 1979. His first Group 1 winner was Ashal in the Ascot Gold Cup in 1990. He became the second jockey of Hamdan Al Maktoum in 1995, and was promoted to first jockey in 1997 following the retirement of Willie Carson. He used to fill in for spares rides for Godolphin Racing.  He retired from the saddle at the Dubai World Cup on Saturday 31 March 2012. On Sky Sports TV coverage, he joked that he retired twice in one day, as the inaugural Dubai Gold Cup in which he was racing had to be re-run, due to a fall by a Godolphin horse, Fox Hunt.



British career wins
 1979 – 2
 1980 – 6
 1981 – 12
 1982 – 31
 1983 – 25
 1984 – 39
 1985 – 39
 1986 – 42

 1987 – 46
 1988 – 52
 1989 – 63
 1990 – 56
 1991 – 67
 1992 – 52
 1993 – 57
 1994 – 59

 1995 – 70
 1996 – 71
 1997 – 85
 1998 – 83
 1999 – 77
 2000 – 81
 2001 – 79
 2002 – 82

 2003 – 75
 2004 – 66
 2005 – 72
 2006 – 54
 2007 – 73
 2008 – 68

Major wins
 Great Britain
 1,000 Guineas – (3) – Harayir (1995), Lahan (2000), Ghanaati (2009)
 2,000 Guineas – (1) – Haafhd (2004)
 Ascot Gold Cup – (1) – Ashal (1990)
 Champion Stakes – (2) – Nayef (2001), Haafhd (2004)
 Coronation Stakes – (1) – Ghanaati (2009)
 Dewhurst Stakes – (1) – Mujahid (1998)
 Falmouth Stakes – (2) – Alshakr (2000), Tashawak (2002)
 International Stakes – (1) – Nayef (2002)
 July Cup – (1) – Elnadim (1998)
 Middle Park Stakes – (2) – Hayil (1997), Awzaan (2009)
 Oaks – (1) – Eswarah (2005)
 Prince of Wales's Stakes – (2) – Mtoto (1987), Nayef (2003)
 Queen Elizabeth II Stakes – (2) – Maroof (1994), Summoner (2001)
 St Leger – (1) – Mutafaweq (1999)

 Canada
 Canadian International Stakes – (1) – Mutamam (2001)

 France
 Prix Morny – (1) – Arcano (2009)
 Prix du Moulin de Longchamp – (1) – Aqlaam (2009)

 Germany
 Aral-Pokal – (1) – Wind in Her Hair (1995)
 Deutschland-Preis – (1) – Mutafaweq (2000)
 Preis der Diana – (1) – Salve Regina (2002)

 Italy
 Gran Premio del Jockey Club – (1) – Ekraar (2003)
 Gran Premio di Milano – (1) – Leadership (2003)

 United Arab Emirates
 Dubai Duty Free Stakes – (1) – Altibr (1999)
 Dubai Sheema Classic – (1) – Nayef (2002)
 Dubai World Cup – (1) – Almutawakel (1999)

See also
List of jockeys

References

External links
 Richard Hills fan website

1963 births
English jockeys
Living people
People educated at Cokethorpe School
Twin sportspeople